Kala Bharati is an auditorium at Pithapuram Colony in Visakhapatnam, India., opened on 3 March 1991. It is owned by Visakha Music and Dance Academy and has a seating capacity of 900.

References

External links
 

Convention centres in India
Buildings and structures in Visakhapatnam
Auditoriums in India